Year 403 (CDIII) was a common year starting on Thursday (link will display the full calendar) of the Julian calendar. At the time, it was known as the Year of the Consulship of Theodosius and Rumoridus (or, less frequently, year 1156 Ab urbe condita). The denomination 403 for this year has been used since the early medieval period, when the Anno Domini calendar era became the prevalent method in Europe for naming years.

Events 
 By place 
 Roman Empire 
 June – Battle of Verona: The Visigoths, under command of King Alaric I, invade Italy again, and advance through the Brenner Pass. Stilicho, with an army of 30,000 men, defeats the Goths north of Verona. Alaric makes a truce, and withdraws eastward to Illyricum. 
 Emperor Honorius and Stilicho are honored with a triumphal march, for the victories against the Goths and Vandals. This becomes the last victory celebrated in Rome.
 Theodosius II, age 2, becomes consul of the Eastern Roman Empire.

 Asia 
 Hui Yuan argues that Buddhist monks should be exempt from bowing to the emperor.
 Asin of Baekje allies with Silla against Gwanggaeto the Great of Goguryeo (Korea).

 By topic 
 Religion 
 The Synod of the Oak deposes and banishes John Chrysostom, bishop of Constantinople, but shortly afterward he is recalled only to be banished again.

Births 
 Hilary, bishop of Arles (d. 449)
 Yuan He, official of the Northern Wei Dynasty (d. 479)

Deaths 
 Epiphanius of Salamis, Church Father
 Severin, bishop of Cologne
 Sima Daozi, regent of the Eastern Jin Dynasty (b. 364)

References